Evla is a village in Resen Municipality in North Macedonia. Located in the northern part of the municipality, it is just under 5 km from the municipal centre of Resen.

Demographics
As of the 2002 census, Evla has 106 residents, roughly one-quarter of its 1961 population.

References

Villages in Resen Municipality